The Puritans were originally members of a group of English Protestants seeking "purity", further reforms or even separation from the established church, during the Reformation. The group is also extended to include some early colonial American ministers and important lay-leaders. The majority of people in this list were mainstream Puritans, adhering strictly to the doctrine of Predestination. The more moderate ones, who tended towards Arminianism, have the label "Arminian" behind their names.

A
Robert Abbot
Joseph Alleine
Richard Alleine
Isaac Ambrose
William Ames
John Arrowsmith
Simon Ashe

B

C

D
Thomas Danforth
John Darrell
John Davenport
Arthur Dent
John Dod
Philip Doddridge
Thomas Doolittle
John Downame
Calybute Downing
Thomas Dudley
John Dury

E
Theophilus Eaton
Jonathan Edwards, American heir of the Puritans who is often listed with them
Stephen Egerrton

F
Humphrey Fenn
John Field
William Fiennes, 1st Viscount Saye and Sele
John Flavel
John Foxe
William Fulke

G
Thomas Gataker
Anthony Gilby
George Gillespie
Bernard Gilpin
Christopher Goodman
Thomas Goodwin
William Gouge
Andrew Gray
Richard Greenham
William Greenhill
John Greenwood
William Guthrie
William Gurnall

H
William Hagar
Edward Hake
Robert Harris
John Harvard
Henry Hastings, 3rd Earl of Huntingdon
Thomas Hastings (colonist)
Alexander Henderson
Matthew Henry
Philip Henry
Charles Herle
Richard Heyrick
Gasper Hickes
Francis Higginson
Arthur Hildersham
Robert Hill (clergyman)
Thomas Hooker
John Howe
Joshua Hoyle
Laurence Humphrey
Anne Hutchinson

I

Henry Ireton

J
James Janeway
Francis Johnson

L
John Lathrop
Edward Leigh
Alexander Leighton
John Ley
John Lightfoot
Morgan Llwyd (Arminian)
Christopher Love

M
Thomas Manton
Francis Marbury
Stephen Marshall
Walter Marshall (Puritan)
Cotton Mather
Increase Mather
Richard Mather
John Maynard (1604–1690)
John Mayo (minister)
Joseph Mede
Walter Mildmay
John Milton
John More

N
Matthew Newcomen
John Norton (Puritan divine)
Nicholas Noyes
Philip Nye

O
 John Owen

P
Herbert Palmer
Robert Parker
Thomas Parker 
John Penry
William Perkins
Andrew Perne
William Phelps
George Phillips (Watertown)
Matthew Poole
John Preston

R
John Rainolds
Mary Rowlandson
Edward Reynolds
Edmund Rice
Robert Rich, 2nd Earl of Warwick
John Robinson
John Rogers
Rev. John Russell, Jr of Hadley, MA
Samuel Rutherford

S
Thomas Sampson
Henry Scudder
Lazarus Seaman
Obadiah Sedgwick
Jeremiah Shepard
Thomas Shepard
Richard Sibbes
Sidrach Simpson
Peter Smart
William Spurstowe
Edmund Staunton
Peter Sterry
Solomon Stoddard
Samuel Stone
Elder John Strong

T
Edward Taylor
Thomas Taylor (priest, 1576–1633)
James Temple
Robert Titus
Walter Travers
Thomas Tregosse
William Twisse

U
John Udal
Nicholas Upsall

V
Richard Vines
Thomas Vincent

W

Y
Patrick Young

See also

List of Puritan poets

Sources 
 Lives of the Puritans by Benjamin Brook and Daniel Neal's History of the Puritans
 Anderson, Robert Charles, The Great Migration Begins, Immigrants to New England, 1620-1640 (multi-vol series), Boston: New Historic Genealogical Society, 1995.
 Beeke, Joel, and Randall Pederson, Meet the Puritans: With a Guide to Modern Reprints, (Reformation Heritage Books, 2006) 
 Cross, Claire, The Puritan Earl, The Life of Henry Hastings, Third Earl of Huntingdon, 1536-1595, New York: St. Martin's Press, 1966.
 Fischer, David Hackett, Albion's Seed, Four British Folkways in America, New York: Oxford University Press, 1989.
 Morison, Samuel Eliot, Builders of the Bay Colony, Boston: Northeastern University Press, 1930 (1981 reprint).
 Powell, Sumner Chilton, Puritan Village, The Formation of a New England Town, Middletown: Wesleyan University Press, 1963.
 Stavely, Keith W.F., Puritan Legacies, Paradise Lost and the New England Tradition, 1630-1890, Ithaca: Cornell University Press, 1987.

 
Puritans